Zale metatoides, the washed-out zale or jack pine false looper, is a moth of the family Noctuidae. The species was first described by James Halliday McDunnough in 1943. It is found in barrens and pine woodlands from at least Wisconsin and probably Manitoba to Maine, south to the mountains of Georgia. The range in the Gulf States is not certain.

The wingspan is about 35 mm. There is one generation per year.

The larvae feed on various hard pines, including jack pine, pitch pine and red pine. They prefer young pine needles. The larvae are usually orange brown, brown or gray but more greenish forms occasionally occur.

External links

Line, Larry. "Washed-Out Zale". Moths of Maryland. Retrieved December 13, 2019.
"Washed-out Zale (Zale metatoides)". Forest Pests. Archived October 31, 2007. With larval stage info.

Catocalinae
Moths of North America
Moths described in 1943